Union Catholic Regional High School is a private Catholic high school located in Scotch Plains, in Union County, New Jersey, United States. Its motto promises to provide a "quality education in a faith-based environment." Founded in 1962 as separate schools for boys and girls, each with its own separate administration and faculty, it has been coeducational since a merger of the two schools in 1980. The school is an active participant in the Anytime/Anywhere learning program. Students from three counties attend the school. The school operates under the auspices of the Roman Catholic Archdiocese of Newark.

As of the 2019–20 school year, the school had an enrollment of 740 students and 59.9 classroom teachers (on an FTE basis), for a student–teacher ratio of 12.4:1. The school's student body was 41.4% (306) White, 19.7% (146) Black, 18.0% (133) Hispanic, 10.9% (81) two or more races, 9.6% (71) Asian and 0.4% (3) Native Hawaiian/ Pacific Islander.

The school has been accredited by the Middle States Association of Colleges and Schools Commission on Elementary and Secondary Schools since November 1969; the school's accreditation expires in May 2023.

History
The first phase of a facility that would cost $3 million (equivalent to $ million in ) to construct and could accommodate 1,500 students opened in September 1962 with an inaugural class of 148 girls and 142 boys. When it was established by the Newark Diocese in 1962, the genders were separated, with the Marist Brothers running the school for boys and the Dominican Sisters the school for girls. The two schools were consolidated in 1980.

Academics

Requirements for graduation
A minimum of 124 Credits is required for graduation and is distributed as follows: English, 20; US History, 10; World History, 5; Lab Sciences, 10; Mathematics, 15; World Language, 10; Phys. Ed., 8, and Religion, a passing grade each year.

Course levels
Union Catholic offers many classes at a variety of levels that range from easy to difficult. Levels include Basic, Regular Adapted, Regular, Honors, Accelerated, and Advanced Placement (AP).

Advanced Placement courses are offered in AP Art History, AP Biology, AP Chemistry, AP English Language and Composition, AP English Literature and Composition, AP Environmental Science, AP United States History, AP United States Government and Politics, AP European History, AP Calculus, AP Statistics, AP Physics B and AP Spanish Language. Accelerated and Honors courses are offered in English, History, Mathematics, World Languages and Science. Most courses available have an Honors/Accelerated/AP equivalent available for students to take provided certain prerequisites are met.

Athletics
The Union Catholic High School Vikings compete in the Union County Interscholastic Athletic Conference, which is comprised of public and private high schools in Union County and was established following a reorganization of sports leagues in Northern New Jersey by the New Jersey State Interscholastic Athletic Association (NJSIAA). Prior to the NJSIAA's 2009 realignment, the school had participated in the Mountain Valley Conference, which included public and private high schools in Essex, Somerset and Union counties. With 614 students in grades 10–12, the school was classified by the NJSIAA for the 2019–20 school year as Non-Public A for most athletic competition purposes, which included schools with an enrollment of 381–1,454 students in that grade range (equivalent to Group I for public schools). Dave Luciano is the athletic director.

The girls' swimming team won the Girls Division B state title in 1980–1982.

The 1984 baseball team finished the season with a 20–3 record after winning the Non-Public Group A state championship, defeating Holy Spirit High School by a score of 8–1 in the tournament final.

The girls' basketball team won the Non-Public Group A state championship in 1987 (against McCorristin Catholic High School), 1988 (vs. Notre Dame High School) and 1989 (vs. Paul VI High School). The 1987 team won the Parochial A state title after defeating McCorristin by a score of 45–42 in the championship game.

The 1987 boys basketball team finished the season with a 25–2 record after winning the Non-Public Group A state championship with a 44–39 victory against runner-up Christian Brothers Academy in the playoff finals.

Union Catholic's girls' volleyball team won the 2005 Non-Public state championship with a win over Lacordaire Academy in the tournament final (25-21, 19–25, 25–22). The win marks the school's first ever state championship.

The boys' 4 × 200 m relay placed first with a time of 1:28.81 at the National Scholastic Indoor Championships in New York City, on March 16, 2008. The boys' 800m sprint medley relay team took first place at the Nike Outdoor National Championship held on June 18, 2008. Their time of 1:31.72 broke the school's record and placed them #7 in New Jersey records.

The boys' track team won the indoor relay Non-Public Group B state championship in 2013, and won the Non-Public A title in 2014. The girls' team won the Non-Public A title in 2015–2020; The program's six state group titles are tied for fifth-most in the state.

The boys' track team won the Non-Public Group A spring / outdoor track state championship in 2013–2015.

The girls' spring / outdoor track team won the Non-Public Group A state championship in 2015–2019.

The girls' cross country team won the Non-Public Group A state championship in 2015 and 2017.

Union Catholic student Sydney McLaughlin, class of 2017, qualified for the 2016 Summer Olympics in Rio de Janeiro in the women's 400-meter hurdles and won the gold medal in the event in 2020, setting the world record in the event.

Technology
Union Catholic High School currently has a Laptop for Learning Program. All Freshman students receive an Fujitsu Laptop.  This laptop is used all four years of high school. Laptops are used for scholarly purposes such as taking notes, searching for information, and doing homework. Students also receive their own @unioncatholic.org email address. This email address is used to send information and notes within the building. Wireless Internet is available throughout the building and can be utilized by all students. Some textbooks are available online, so students are not required to bring all textbooks to class. An acceptable use policy is in place to prevent misuse of the Internet. UC also has a virtual library that utilizes various Internet databases. Smartboard (virtual blackboards) are available in some classrooms.

Performing Arts Company
The Union Catholic Performing Arts Company (UCPAC) showcases professional theatre on a high school level. The company celebrated their 25th anniversary in 2006 with their fall comedy:  and their spring musical: Sugar which is based on the movie Some Like it Hot. Some of their past plays include: Arsenic and Old Lace, Fools, and Inspecting Carol. Some of their past musicals might include: Pippin, A Funny Thing Happened on the Way to the Forum, Honk!, and Seussical. In 2007 the fall comedy was The Musical Comedy Murders of 1940, and the spring musical production was Joseph and the Amazing Technicolor Dreamcoat. The 2008-2009 UCPAC Season presented the play Incorruptible by Michael Hollinger in the Fall and the musical Into the Woods by Stephen Sondheim in the spring. The summer production Love (Awkwardly) was performed on the Union Catholic stage during the Summer of 2009. It then moved to NYC Off-Broadway at the end of the summer. Due to critical acclaim, it returned to NYC in January 2010. In the 2009–10 school year, UCPAC presented Noises Off and Les Misérables. The 10–11 season showed The Nerd and The Drowsy Chaperone. In the 2011-12 year, UCPAC presented The Miss Firecracker Contest and Zombie Prom. The 2012–2013 season showcased Stepping Out and Legally Blonde. The 14–15 season performed Boeing-Boeing in the fall and Hairspray in the spring. The 15–16 season performed The Cripple of Inishmaan in the fall and Bring It On in the spring. The 16–17 season showcased Rumors in the fall and In The Heights in the spring. The 17–18 season consisted of Peter and the Starcatcher for the fall play and The Mystery of Edwin Drood as the spring musical. The 18–19 season consisted of A Flea in Her Ear and Spamalot. The 2019-20 year featured Clue on Stage and Mamma Mia!.
the 2021-22 year featured You Can't Take It with You (play) and Jesus Christ Superstar.

Notable alumni

 Tate George (born 1968), point guard who played in the NBA for the New Jersey Nets and the Milwaukee Bucks.
 Bill Hynes (born 1972, class of 1990), professional auto racing driver and entrepreneur.
 Kyle Lofton (born 1999), college basketball player for the St. Bonaventure Bonnies.
 Damon Lynn (born 1995, class of 2013), college basketball player for the NJIT Highlanders.
 Sydney McLaughlin (born 1999, class of 2017), hurdler and sprinter who is an Olympic gold medalist and world record holder in the women's 400-meter hurdles at the 2020 Summer Olympics.
 Victoria Napolitano (born 1988 née Spellman, class of 2006), politician who is currently serving as a Councilwoman of Moorestown Township, New Jersey who became Moorestown's youngest Mayor ever at the age of 26, making her the youngest female to ever hold the office of Mayor statewide.
 George Papas (born 1998), professional basketball player for Olympiacos of the Greek Basket League and the EuroLeague
 Fabiana Pierre-Louis (born 1980, class of 1998), Associate Justice on the New Jersey Supreme Court since 2020.
 Mike Seamon (born 1988), soccer midfielder who has played for the Seattle Sounders FC and the Pittsburgh Riverhounds.
 Thomas Chatterton Williams (born 1981), cultural critic and author.
 Bob Wischusen (born 1971, class of 1989), sportscaster who is a college football and basketball voice for ESPN and ESPN International, the radio voice for the New York Jets.

References

External links
Union Catholic Regional High School web site
Data for Union Catholic Regional High School, National Center for Education Statistics

1962 establishments in New Jersey
Educational institutions established in 1962
Middle States Commission on Secondary Schools
Private high schools in Union County, New Jersey
Roman Catholic Archdiocese of Newark
Catholic secondary schools in New Jersey
Scotch Plains, New Jersey